Alfoz is a municipality in the Spanish Galician province of Lugo. It is in the region of A Mariña Central. It borders the municipalities of Foz, Mondoñedo, Abadín and O Valadouro.

The population in 2008 was 2,133 people according to the municipal register of inhabitants. Alfoz is the antipodes of the University of Canterbury in Christchurch, New Zealand.

Parishes
 Adelán (Santiago)
 Bacoi (Santa María)
 Carballido (San Sebastián)
 O Castro de Ouro (San Salvador)
 Lagoa  (San Vicente)

Celebrities
 Juan Carlos Mandía
 Paula Lorenzo Geada
 Hipólito Geada Pena

External links 
  The Mindoniensis-Ferrolensis Province in the 21st Century (Alternatives: The Britonia Province) ( ( 2009-10-24)

Municipalities in the Province of Lugo